JWH-015 is a chemical from the naphthoylindole family that acts as a subtype-selective cannabinoid agonist. Its affinity for CB2 receptors is 13.8 nM, while its affinity for CB1 is 383 nM, meaning that it binds almost 28 times more strongly to CB2 than to CB1. However, it still displays some CB1 activity, and in some model systems can be very potent and efficacious at activating CB1 receptors, and therefore it is not as selective as newer drugs such as JWH-133. It has been shown to possess immunomodulatory effects, and CB2 agonists may be useful in the treatment of pain and inflammation. It was discovered and named after John W. Huffman.

Metabolism
JWH-015 has been shown in vitro to be metabolized primarily by hydroxylation and N-dealkylation, and also by epoxidation of the naphthalene ring, similar to the metabolic pathways seen for other aminoalkylindole cannabinoids such as WIN 55,212-2. Epoxidation of polycyclic aromatic hydrocarbons (see for example  benzo(a)pyrene toxicity) can produce carcinogenic metabolites, although there is no evidence to show that JWH-015 or other aminoalkylindole cannabinoids are actually carcinogenic in vivo.  A study published in the British Journal of Cancer shows that JWH-015 may signal certain cancers to shrink through a process called apoptosis.

Legal status

In the United States, all CB1 receptor agonists of the 3-(1-naphthoyl)indole class such as JWH-015 are Schedule I Controlled Substances.

As of October 2015 JWH-015 is a controlled substance in China.

References

Naphthoylindoles
JWH cannabinoids
Designer drugs
CB1 receptor agonists
CB2 receptor agonists